The Lubal Manufacturing & Distributing Company buildings are a set of two industrial buildings in the Franklinton neighborhood of Columbus, Ohio. The site was listed on the Columbus Register of Historic Properties in 2015 and the National Register of Historic Places in 2016. The buildings include 373 West Rich Street, built c. 1900, and 375 West Rich Street, built c. 1911. With much of the original materials intact, the buildings are few remaining that demonstrate Franklinton's early industrial and commercial history.

See also
 National Register of Historic Places listings in Columbus, Ohio

References

External links
 

Commercial buildings completed in 1900
Columbus Register properties
National Register of Historic Places in Columbus, Ohio
1900 establishments in Ohio
Franklinton (Columbus, Ohio)